Mount Baldy is located in Washoe County, Nevada in the Mount Rose Wilderness.

So, Mount Baldy West Rim is right at the interstate border in Placer County (California), and Mount Baldy is in Washoe County in Nevada, and Mount Baldy is merely 0.3 miles from CA-Nevada border. To make things more confusing, Mount San Antonio, the highest point in Los Angeles County, California, is called Mount Baldy locally in that county.

See also
 List of highest points in California by county

References

Baldy
Mountains of Washoe County, Nevada